Cap-Haïtien is an arrondissement in the Nord department of Haiti and is the second important city of the country. Known as the historical and touristic capital of the country. Cap-Haïtien was founded in 1670 by the French settler Bertrand d'Ogeron de La Bouëre. As of 2015, the population was 356,908 inhabitants. The city is governed by three mayors elected by popular vote every 5 years and also represented in the National Assembly of Haiti with one member elected every 4 years. Postal codes in Cap-Haïtien Arrondissement start with the number 11.

The arrondissement consists of the following communes:
 Cap-Haïtien
 Quartier-Morin
 Limonade

References

External links

 Geohive Data for Haiti
 Mongabay Information for Cap-Haïtien

Arrondissements of Haiti
Nord (Haitian department)